Oleksandr Bogach is a Ukrainian retired footballer.

Career
Oleksandr Bogach was a Pupil of UOR Simferopol. After graduation, he played for the Tytan Armiansk. Since 2001 in Tavriya Simferopol. He played three matches in the top league of the Ukrainian championship. Debut - September 22, 2001 in a game with "Metalist" (1: 4).

After "Tavria" he played in the clubs of the Ukrainian First League and Ukrainian Second League: Dynamo Simferopol, Polissya Zhytomyr, Oleksandriya, Olkom Melitopol, Mykolaiv, Krymteplytsia Molodizhne. In summer 2009 he moved to Desna Chernihiv, the main club of the city of Chernihiv, here he played two matches. In 2011 he became the champion of Crimea under Vladislav Maltsev in the Guards. In 2012 he played in the Nikolaev "Torpedo". In the beginning of 2013 because of rejuvenation of structure of the Nikolaev team, he continued the career in the Tavriya Simferopol team.

References

External links 
 Oleksandr Bogach footballfacts.ru
 Oleksandr Bogach allplayers.in.ua

1983 births
Living people
FC Desna Chernihiv players
FC Tytan Armyansk players
SC Tavriya Simferopol players
FC Ihroservice Simferopol players
FC Polissya Zhytomyr players
FC Oleksandriya players
SC Olkom Melitopol players
FC Krymteplytsia Molodizhne players
Ukrainian footballers
Ukrainian Premier League players
Ukrainian First League players
Ukrainian Second League players
Association football defenders